Kumurly (Kömärle) is a rural locality (a selo) in Lipovsky Selsoviet, Arkhangelsky District, Bashkortostan, Russia. The population was 296 as of 2010. There are 9 streets.

Geography 
Kumurly is located 26 km northwest of Arkhangelskoye (the district's administrative centre) by road. Blagoveshchenka is the nearest rural locality.

References 

Rural localities in Arkhangelsky District